The 2016 FIA Cross Country Rally World Cup season is the 24th season of the FIA Cross Country Rally World Cup.

Calendar
The calendar for the 2016 season features nine rallies. Some of the rallies are also part of the FIM Cross-Country Rallies World Championship and the FIM Bajas World Cup.

The six Bajas award 30 points to the winner, whereas the other four events are worth 60 points for the winner.

Notable teams and drivers

Results

Championship standings
In order to score points in the Cup classifications, competitors must register with the FIA before the entry closing date of the first rally/baja entered.
Points system
 Points for final positions are awarded as per the following table:

Drivers' championship
Any driver is required to participate in at least one Baja and one Cross-Country event in order to be able to score points for the FIA World Cup.

Teams' championship
Any team is required to participate in at least one Baja and one Cross-Country event in order to be able to score points for the FIA World Cup.

References

External links
 

Cross Country Rally World Cup
Cross Country Rally World Cup